Fahriye Evcen Özçivit (born 4 June 1986) is a German-born Turkish actress and model. She is known for her roles as Necla Tekin in the TV series  Yaprak Dökümü and as Feride in the TV series Çalıkuşu, both on based on novels by Reşat Nuri Güntekin.

Life and career 
At young age while she was on a vacation in Turkey, she took part in a program of Oya Aydoğan, who introduced her to producer İbrahim Mertoğlu. One of her first prominent roles was that of the character of Necla in the TV series Yaprak Dökümü. Her first cinematic debut was with the movie Cennet, released in 2008, and in the same year she was cast in a leading role in the movie Aşk Tutulması. As Evcen had not finished her studies in Germany, she enrolled in Boğaziçi University and studied history. She later played the character Feride in the TV series Çalıkuşu produced by TİMS Productions. She later acted in the movie Aşk Sana Benzer opposite Burak Özçivit. In 2017 she acted in the TV series Ölene Kadar opposite Engin Akyürek and also played in the movie Sonsuz Aşk opposite Murat Yıldırım. In 2021, she acted in Alparslan: Büyük Selçuklu as Akça Hatun, and in the same year she launched her own line of clothing under the name Ivy People.

Personal life 
Her maternal family is of Circassian descent. Her paternal family is of Turkish descent who immigrated from Kavala, Ottoman Empire. On 29 June 2017, she married actor and model Burak Özçivit in Istanbul. Their first son named Karan was born on 13 April 2019. Their second son named Kerem was born on 18 January 2023.

Filmography

Ads / partnerships

Awards and nominations

References

External links
 
 

1986 births
Living people
People from Solingen
German film actresses
Turkish film actresses
German television actresses
Turkish television actresses
German actresses
German people of Turkish descent
German people of Circassian descent
Turkish people of Circassian descent